Saib Tabrizi (Mīrzā Muḥammad ʿalī Ṣāʾib) was an Iranian poet, regarded as one of the greatest masters of a form of classical Persian lyric poetry characterized by rhymed couplets, known as the ghazal. He  also established the "Indian style" (sabk-i Hind) in the literature of his native language, Azerbaijani Turkic, in which he is known to have written 17 ghazals and molammaʿs.

Saib was born in Tabriz, and educated in Isfahan and at some time around 1626, he traveled to India, where he was received into the court of Shah Jahan. He stayed for a time in Kabul and in Kashmir, returning home after several years abroad. After his return, the emperor of Persia, Shah Abbas II, bestowed upon him the title King of Poets.

Saib's reputation is based primarily on some 300,000 couplets, including his epic poem Qandahār-nāma (“The Campaign Against Qandahār”). (The city of Qandahār or Kandahar in today's Afghanistan was in Saib Tabrizi's lifetime a long-standing bone of contention between the Mughal rulers of India and the Safavid rulers of Persia - both of whom were at different times the poet's patrons - until definitely given over to Persian rule as a result of the Mughal–Safavid War of 1649–53.)

Saib Tabrizi's “Indian style” verses reveal an elegant wit, a gift for the aphorism and the proverb, and a keen appreciation of philosophical and intellectual exercise. Saib was especially well known for his Persian panegyric poetry during the reigns of Persian Emperors Safi, Abbas II and Suleiman.

A line from Saib's poem on Kabul provided the title for Khaled Hosseini's 2007 novel, A Thousand Splendid Suns.

Biography

Early life
Saib Tabrizi was either of Persian or Azerbaijani ancestry, with Azerbaijani as his native tongue. Growing up, Tabrizi was a privileged child. His father, Mirzā ʿAbd-al-Raḥim, was a successful merchant, and his uncle, Šams-al-Din, was well-known for his calligraphy skills. Tabrizi's family was among those evacuated by Abbas I in response to Ottoman incursions. He settled in Isfahan with his family. Tabrizi was educated in Isfahan and began his literary career. During this time, Tabrizi also made pilgrimages to Mecca, Najaf and Karbala.

Travels abroad
Tabrizi felt the Mughal courts of India was the best choice to enhance his literary career. Sometime in the middle of the 1620s, he arrived in Kabul and met with the governor of the city, Mirzā Aḥsan-Allāh Ẓafar Khan. He formed a close friendship with Zafar Khan who was his primary patron over the next few years. Tabrizi accompanied Zafar Khan and his father on military campaigns in the Deccan Plateau, before returning to Isfahan in 1632.

Return to Iran
Tabrizi returned to Iran in 1632 and spent the rest of his life there. He maintained a relationship with the Safavid courts and dedicated poems Abbas II and Shah Soleyman III. Abbas II appointed Tabrizi to the post of poet laureate.

Tabrizi died in 1676 and was buried in Isfahan.

Saib method in poetry
He developed a method which was called Indian method. Tabrizi is also credited with establishing the "Indian style" (sabk-i Hind) of Azerbaijani əruz poetry (poetry using quantifying prosody).

See also 
 Saeb Mausoleum
 Saadi Shirazi
 Hafez

References

External links

A poem by Saeb, after his visit from the Kabul city

Sources
J. Newman, Andrew, Safavid Iran: Rebirth of a Persian Empire, I.B.Tauris, 2006, .
"Ṣāʾib." Encyclopædia Britannica from Encyclopædia Britannica 2007 Ultimate Reference Suite .(2008)
Etelaat newspaper, 2014

17th-century Persian-language poets
People from Tabriz
1592 births
1677 deaths